The Mail on Sunday is a British conservative newspaper, published in a tabloid format. It is the biggest-selling Sunday newspaper in the UK and was launched in 1982 by Lord Rothermere. Its sister paper, the Daily Mail, was first published in 1896.

In July 2011, after the closure of the News of the World, The Mail on Sunday sold some 2.5 million copies a week—making it Britain's biggest-selling Sunday newspaper—but by September that had fallen back to just under 2 million. Like the Daily Mail it is owned by the Daily Mail and General Trust (DMGT), but the editorial staffs of the two papers are entirely separate. It had an average weekly circulation of 1,284,121 in December 2016; this had fallen to 673,525 by December 2022. In April 2020 the Society of Editors announced that the Mail on Sunday was the winner of the Sunday Newspaper of the Year for 2019.

History
The Mail on Sunday was launched on 2 May 1982, to complement the Daily Mail, the first time Associated Newspapers had published a national Sunday title since it closed the once hugely successful Sunday Dispatch in 1961. The first story on the front page was the Royal Air Force's bombing of Stanley airport in the Falkland Islands. The newspaper's owner, the Daily Mail and General Trust (DMGT), initially wanted a circulation of 1.25 million; however, by that measure the launch of The Mail on Sunday was not a success, for by the sixth week sales were peaking at just 700,000. Its sports coverage was seen to be among its weaknesses at the time of its launch. The Mail on Sunday'''s first back-page splash was a report from Lisbon on the roller hockey world championships, although this was more newsworthy than it would have been otherwise since it involved an English team facing an Argentinian team during the Falklands War.

Lord Rothermere, then the proprietor, brought in the Daily Mails editor David English (later Sir David) who, with a task force of new journalists, redesigned and re-launched The Mail on Sunday. Over a period of three-and-a-half months English managed to halt the paper's decline, and its circulation increased to 840,000. Three new sections were introduced: firstly a sponsored partwork, the initial one forming a cookery book; then a colour comic supplement (an innovation in the British Sunday newspaper market); and lastly, a magazine—You magazine.

The newspaper's reputation was built on the work of its next editor, Stewart Steven. The newspaper's circulation grew from around one million to just under two million during his time in charge. Although its sister paper the Daily Mail has invariably supported the Conservative Party, Steven backed the SDP / Liberal Alliance in the 1983 General Election. The subsequent editors were Jonathan Holborow, Peter Wright and Geordie Greig, who became editor of the Daily Mail in September 2018 and was replaced at the Sunday title by Ted Verity. In 2021 Verity left to edit the Daily Mail and was replaced by his deputy David Dillon.

In the 2016 United Kingdom European Union membership referendum, the paper — unlike its daily counterpart — came out unequivocally in favour of the Remain campaign. The Mail on Sunday has, following the change of editor from Geordie Greig to Ted Verity, shifted to a more Eurosceptic stance.

Lawsuits
In January 2020, The Mail on Sunday was ordered to pay £180,000 in damages to a former council official in Rochdale due to a false article from May 2017. It falsely alleged that the man issued taxi licenses to drivers involved in the town's child sexual abuse ring. Waj Iqbal believed that the false accusations were solely because he was of the same Pakistani background as the abusers.

In February 2021, the High Court found that The Mail on Sunday acted unlawfully when it published a letter that Meghan, Duchess of Sussex had sent to her father. The newspaper was sued for her £1.5 million legal fees, and ordered to issue a front-page apology.

The will be a free digital only edition of the paper on Christmas Day 2022 like in 2005, 2011 and 2016 no trip to open the shops on Christmas Day. Like the weekly paper would be published on Christmas Eve.

Phone hacking
Under Peter Wright's editorship of the Mail on Sunday and his membership of the Press Complaints Commission (PCC), the Mail newspaper organisation withheld important evidence about phone hacking from the PCC when the latter held its inquiry into the News of the World's interception of voicemail messages. Specifically, the PCC was not informed that four Mail on Sunday journalists—investigations editor Dennis Rice, news editor Sebastian Hamilton, deputy news editor David Dillon and feature writer Laura Collins—had been told by the Metropolitan Police in 2006 that their mobile phones had been hacked even though Wright, who was editor of the Mail on Sunday, had been made aware of the hacking. The facts did not emerge until several years later, when they were revealed in evidence at the News of the World phone hacking trial.

Wright became a member of the PCC from May 2008. He took over the place previously held by the Daily Mail's editor-in-chief Paul Dacre, who had served on the body from 1999 to April 2008. The PCC issued two reports, in 2007 and 2009, which were compiled in ignorance of the significant information from the Mail group about the hacking of its journalists’ phones. According to The Guardian journalist Nick Davies, whose revelations had resulted in the News of the World phone hacking trial and subsequent conviction of Andy Coulson, this reinforced News International's "rogue reporter" defence. The PCC's 2009 report, which had rejected Davies' claims of widespread hacking at the News of the World, was retracted when it became clear that they were true. Wright and Dacre both also failed to mention the hacking of the four Mail on Sunday staff in the evidence they gave to the Leveson inquiry in 2012.

Sections

 You: You magazine is a women's magazine featured in The Mail on Sunday. Its mix of in-depth features plus fashion, beauty advice, practical insights on health and relationships, food recipes and interiors pages make it a regular read for over 3 million women (and 2.3  million men) every week. The Mail on Sunday is read by over six million a week.
 Event: this magazine includes articles on the arts, books and culture and carries reviews of all media and entertainment forms and interviews with sector personalities. It also has columns by well-known people such as Piers Morgan.
 Sport on Sunday: a separate 24-page section edited by Alison Kervin. It features coverage of the Premier League and Football League games on Sunday and important international football games, motor racing and many other sports. Columnists include Stuart Broad and Glenn Hoddle. It is a campaigning and investigative sports section which ran a three-year concussion campaign (from 2013) to keep players in rugby union safe from ECT and brain damage.
 Financial Mail on Sunday: now part of the main paper, this section includes the Financial Mail Enterprise, focusing on small businesses.
 Mail on Sunday 2: This pullout includes reviews, featuring articles on the arts, books and culture and it consists of reviews of all media and entertainment forms and interviews with sector personalities, property, travel and health.
 Cartoons including The Gambols and Peanuts.

Angela Rayner story
In April 2022 the Mail on Sunday published an article which alleged that unnamed Conservative Party MPs claimed that Labour's deputy leader Angela Rayner tried to distract the Prime Minister, Boris Johnson, by crossing and uncrossing her legs.  

The article was widely condemned, with Johnson describing it as "sexist tripe". The Speaker of the House of Commons, Sir Lindsay Hoyle, called the story "misogynistic and offensive" and requested a meeting with the Mail on Sunday's editor, David Dillon. In response to the invitation, the Daily Mail published a front page headline which read: "No Mister Speaker: In the name of a free press, The Mail respectfully declines the Commons Speaker's summons...".

The Independent Press Standards Organisation received 5,500 complaints about the article and reported and investigated possible breaches of clauses one (accuracy), three (harassment) and 12 (discrimination) of the Editors' Code of Practice.

Notable writers
Current
 Peter Hitchens 
 Liz Jones
 Piers Morgan
 Tom Parker Bowles
 Chris Evans
 David Mellor
 Dan Hodges
 Anna Mikhailova

Past
 Derek Draper
 John Junor
 Julie Burchill
 Austin Mitchell
 Norman Tebbit
 Suzanne Moore
 Rachel Johnson
 Louise Eccles
 Frank Barrett

Editors
1982: Bernard Shrimsley
1982: David English
1982: Stewart Steven
1992: Jonathan Holborow
1998: Peter Wright
2012: Geordie Greig
2018: Ted Verity
2021: David Dillon

 See also 
 Irish Mail on Sunday''

References

External links
 

Daily Mail and General Trust
1982 establishments in the United Kingdom
Conservative media in the United Kingdom
National newspapers published in the United Kingdom
Publications established in 1982
Sunday newspapers published in the United Kingdom